Government Medical College, Raigarh (also known as Late Shri Lakhiram Agrawal Memorial Government Medical College), is a government medical school located in Raigarh, Chhattisgarh, India. It is affiliated with Pt. Deendayal Upadhyay Memorial Health Sciences and Ayush University of Chhattisgarh, Raipur. It was established in 2013.

Fees 
Tuition, sometimes referred to as a "course fee," is due at the time of admission. The 2019-20 school year's tuition rate was 50,000 rupees, while the domicile/hostel fee was 500 rupees. The NEET fee is 750-1500 rupees per attempt. The school also offers scholarships, fee concessions, and educational loans.

Living facilities 
Separate guarded hostels are available for men and women, with two students sharing a room. Students may install coolers or other furniture, subject to certain rules and regulations. Interns and junior doctors live in separate buildings. Guest rooms and accommodation for teachers and staff are also available. Several messes are available to students on campus.

Academics
A M.B.B.S. degree is offered. Class size is 60 students; they study at the college hospital, as well as Kirodimal Government Hospital and an affiliated maternity center.

References

Medical colleges in Chhattisgarh
Colleges affiliated to Pt. Deendayal Upadhyay Memorial Health Sciences and Ayush University of Chhattisgarh
Raigarh district
2013 establishments in Chhattisgarh
Educational institutions established in 2013